Salé-City railway station or Gare de Salé-Ville is a train terminal administered by ONCF in Salé, Morocco. The station is the biggest train station in Salé in terms of traffic, and is considered as the main train station of the city. It is directly connected with the Rabat–Salé tramway.

References

Railway stations in Morocco
Transport in Salé